Sinop Fortress is a historic castle in Sinop, Turkey.

Location
The castle is located in Sinop district of Sinop Province. The historical Sinop Fortress Prison is situated in the castle.

History
Sinop Fortress was built in the 8th century by  immigrants coming from Miletus. The Genoese improved the fortress. The castle was included in the World Heritage Tentative List in 2013. The castle underwent restoration starting in 2019.

Architecture
Length of the bastions and walls are 2.000 meters. Bastions are 8 meters wide and 25 meters high.

References

Buildings and structures in Sinop Province
Byzantine fortifications in Turkey
Buildings and structures completed in the 8th century
Sinop, Turkey
World Heritage Tentative List for Turkey